András Tóth is the name of:

András Tóth (footballer born 1949), Hungarian footballer who played in the 1978 FIFA World Cup
András Tóth (footballer born 1973), current Hungarian footballer